The war between the Argentine Confederation and the state of Buenos Aires was a conflict of the Argentine Civil War. It began with the secession of Buenos Aires from Argentina, and lasted from 1852 to 1862. With the military victory of Buenos Aires at the battle of Pavón, the country was unified again.

References

Citations

Bibliography

 
 
 

Campaigns of the Argentine Civil War
Military campaigns involving Argentina